In electrochemistry, the Cottrell equation describes the change in electric current with respect to time in a controlled potential experiment, such as  chronoamperometry. Specifically it describes the current response when the potential is a step function in time. It was derived by Frederick Gardner Cottrell in 1903. For a simple redox event, such as the ferrocene/ferrocenium couple, the current measured depends on the rate at which the analyte diffuses to the electrode.  That is, the current is said to be "diffusion controlled".  The Cottrell equation describes the case for an electrode that is planar but can also be derived for spherical, cylindrical, and rectangular geometries by using the corresponding Laplace operator and boundary conditions in conjunction with Fick's second law of diffusion.

where,
= current, in units of A
 = number of electrons (to reduce/oxidize one molecule of analyte , for example)
 = Faraday constant, 96485 C/mol
 = area of the (planar) electrode in cm2
 = initial concentration of the reducible analyte  in mol/cm3;
 = diffusion coefficient for species  in cm2/s
 = time in s.
Deviations from linearity in the plot of   vs. sometimes indicate that the redox event is associated with other processes, such as association of a ligand, dissociation of a ligand, or a change in geometry.

In practice, the Cottrell equation simplifies to  where   is the collection of constants for a given system.

See also 
 Voltammetry
 Electroanalytical methods
 Limiting current
 Anson equation

References

Electrochemical equations